Francis Beale (1577 – at least 1637), of Barnes, Surrey and later of Newport, Isle of Wight, was an English politician.

He was a Member (MP) of the Parliament of England for Northampton in 1614.

References

1577 births
17th-century deaths
People from Barnes, London
People from Newport, Isle of Wight
English MPs 1614